The Asmara-Massawa Cableway was a cableway (or "ropeway") built in Italian Eritrea before World War II.The Eritrean Ropeway, completed in 1937, ran 71.8 km from the south end of Asmara to the city-port of Massawa.

History

The cableway was built by the Italian engineering firm Ceretti and Tanfani S.A. in Eritrea. It connected the port of Massawa with the city of Italian Asmara and ran a distance of nearly 72 kilometres. It also moved food, supplies and war materials for the Imperial Italian Army, which had also conquered Ethiopia in 1936. In August 1936 was opened the first section of 26.6 km from Ghinda to Godaif, a suburb of Asmara.

With the capacity to transport 30 tons of material every hour in each direction from the seaport of Massawa to 2326 meters above sea level in Asmara, the cableway was the longest of its kind in the world when inaugurated in 1937. The bearing cables were in almost 30 sections, were powered by diesel engines, and carried freight in 1540 small transport gondolas. In southern Eritrea there was another small ropeway.

During their eleven-year military administration (1941-1952) of the former Italian colony, the British dismantled the installations. They removed the diesel engines, the steel cables, and other equipment as war reparations. Iron towers that remained were scrapped in the 1980s.

See also
Eritrean Railway
Italian Eritrea

Notes

External links

Extensive article by Mike Metras
Facsimile of La Teleferica Massaua-Asmara cableway brochure, translated by Mike Metras, Dave Engstrom, and Renato Guadino

Asmara
Massawa
Transport in Eritrea
Vertical transport devices
Italian colonisation in Africa
Italian East Africa
Aerial tramways